Madan Deodhar is an Indian actor prominently featuring in Marathi films.

Career

Deodhar started his acting career as a child actor in the Hindi film Mahek (2007), a coming-of-age film directed by Kranti Kanade. The film won Best Feature Film Award at Arpa International Film Festival. In 2009 he went on to play the lead role in the Marathi film Vihir. Deodhar portrayed the character of a school going swimmer Sameer who is very close to his cousin Nachiket (played by Alok Rajwade). Nachiket dies by drowning in a well and shocked Sameer sets on a journey to find meaning to life. The film received multiple awards and Deodhar's performance was also appreciated. Film's review in IBN Live called Deodhar and Rajwade's work as "outstanding" and credits them for the film's success. In 2010, he played the childhood role of actor Sharman Joshi in the Hindi film Allah Ke Banday. In 2012, he also appeared in a Bhojpuri film He about a slum boy who gets a chance to work in films. At the time of filming of He, he was the first year's student of Brihan Maharashtra College of Commerce at Pune. In 2013, the Marathi film Balak Palak had him play one of the lead roles. He also featured in a commercial of Idea Cellular's 'No Ullu Banaoing' campaign in 2014. In 2019 he played the role of Maratha Captain in the hindi movie Laal Kaptaan.

Filmography

Films

Television

References

External links
 

Indian male film actors
Male actors in Marathi cinema
Living people
Male actors from Pune
Male actors in Hindi cinema
1994 births